Kurt Wissemann was a German World War I flying ace credited with five aerial victories.

Biography
Born in Elberfeld, Wissemann trained as a Leutnant with Jastaschule 1  (Fighter school 1) before being posted to Jasta 3 on 28 May 1917. He claimed 5 victories during 1917, one of which was reputed to be top French ace Capitaine Georges Guynemer on 11 September. He was killed in action over Westrozebeke, allegedly versus Rene Fonck but documentary evidence suggests it was more probably either Captain Reginald Hoidge or Captain Geoffrey Hilton Bowman of No. 56 Squadron, Royal Flying Corps.

Sources of information

Reference
 Above the Lines: The Aces and Fighter Units of the German Air Service, Naval Air Service and Flanders Marine Corps, 1914–1918. Norman Franks, Frank W. Bailey, Russell Guest. Grub Street, 1993. , .

1893 births
1917 deaths
German World War I flying aces
People from Elberfeld
People from the Rhine Province
Prussian Army personnel
Luftstreitkräfte personnel
German military personnel killed in World War I
Aviators killed by being shot down
Military personnel from Wuppertal